Schieferdecker may refer to 
7881 Schieferdecker, a main-belt asteroid 
Bettina Schieferdecker (born 1968), a German gymnast
Johann Christian Schieferdecker (1679–1732), a German Baroque composer